Lupburg is a municipality in the district of Neumarkt in Bavaria in Germany.

Mayors

Manfred Hauser (CSU) was elected the new mayor in October 2015. He is the successor of Alfred Meier, who died in August 2015.

Sightseeing
The restored Lupburg Castle, which was destroyed by the Swedes in the Thirty Years War, tower over the city's cobblestone market square, which also features a beautiful medieval church.  The castle was restored in 2012-13 and now houses government administrative offices. The city of Parsberg and the U.S. Army installation at Hohenfels are nearby, as is the lovely Altmuhl River valley.  In addition to these, numerous castles and ruins are in the area.

Clubs
The Society for Creative Anachronism has a local branch, the Stronghold of Nebelwald, which stretches from the Parsberg-Lupburg area in the far south to Vilseck in the north.

Churches
Like all of Bavaria, the city is predominantly Roman Catholic
Latter-day Saints living in Lupburg belong to the Regensburg Branch of the Nuremberg Stake.

References

External links
 History of the Coat of Arms of Lupburg

Neumarkt (district)